Bandera Negra (Black Flag) or Santa Germandat Catalana (Holy Catalan Brotherhood) was the secret, armed sub-organization of the Estat Català political party, founded on May 3, 1925.

Its name referred to the black flag raised by the defenders of Barcelona during the Catalan Campaign (1713-1714) on August 1, 1714, signaling to the Bourbon troops that they would fight to the death and never capitulate. Although, on September 12 they would capitulate, thus ending the cause of the Archduke of Austria. However, the historian Enric Ucelay-Da Cal relates it to "the traditional symbol associated with the will to kill or die".

History 
This is how the historian Enric Ucelay-Da Cal explains how Bandera Negra was born:

The organization had approximately twelve leading members and some sympathizers. The most notable head of the organization was Marcel·lí Perelló, together with Jaume Compte (also a member of the Autonomous Center of Trade and Industry Dependents). Notable members include: Miquel Badia, Daniel Cardona (head abroad), Ramon Xammar, Emili Granier Barrera, Jaume Julià, Joan Bertran and Jaume Balius. It also had committees in Béziers (France) and in Buenos Aires.

Bandera Negra carried out the attack against King Alfonso XIII on the Garraf coast (Garraf plot) and some other impactful armed actions, such as the bomb attack against the house of the Baron of Maldá. 

References

Further reading 

 Ucelay-Da Cal, Enric (2018). Breve historia del separatismo catalán. Barcelona: B. Penguin Random House Grupo Editorial. .

1925 establishments in Spain
Catalan nationalism
Terrorism in Spain